ASP is a Japanese alternative idol girl group formed by WACK in 2021. They debuted with the studio album, Anal Sex Penis, on May 26, 2021.

History
On March 27, 2021, WACK announced that a new group, ASP, had been formed. Initially the members faces were hidden until they reached 20,000 followers on Twitter. Eventually after the gradual reveal of their faces the members were confirmed to be former Carry Loose member Yumeka Nowkana?, former Wagg trainee Naayu, Nameless and Mog Ryan. They released their debut studio album, Anal Sex Penis, on May 26. Their first single, "The Man Calling", was released on September 22. Naayu left ASP on November 24 due to a worsening foot injury. During Naayu's final live show with the group, ASP introduced twin sisters, Matilder and Wonker, as new members.

They released their second studio album, Placebo, on January 5, 2022. On March 26, it was announced that two new members, CCCCCC and Riontown, would join the group on May 7. Their second single, "Bollocks", was released on April 13. On May 24, they released the digital single "Haikei Rockstarsama 2022". "They made their major label debut with the single, "Hyper Cracker", through Avex Trax on August 31. On November 30, they released the digital single "I won't let you go".

They will release their first EP, Delicious Vicious, on April 26, 2023.

Members

Current

Former

Timeline

Discography

Studio albums

Extended plays

Singles

As lead artist

Collaborations

References

Japanese girl groups
Japanese idol groups
Japanese pop music groups
Musical groups from Tokyo
Musical groups established in 2021
2021 establishments in Japan